Kabakovo is a rural locality (a selo) in Aleysky District, Altai Krai, Russia. The population was 579 as of 2013. There are 14 streets.

Geography 
Kabakovo is located 38 km southwest of Aleysk (the district's administrative centre) by road. Kashino is the nearest rural locality.

References 

Rural localities in Aleysky District